B. ginsengisoli may refer to:

Bacillus ginsengisoli, a Gram-positive bacterium.
Brachybacterium ginsengisoli, a Gram-positive bacterium.
Brevibacillus ginsengisoli, a Gram-positive bacterium.